Kawê Ferreira Godoy Viana (born 22 June 2002), is a Brazilian footballer who plays as a forward for Red Bull Bragantino

Club career
Born in São Paulo, Kawê began his career with the futsal team of Corinthians. In September 2018, after playing for Audax, he joined América Mineiro's youth setup.

On 6 July 2020, after signing a professional contract, Kawê was promoted to the main squad by manager Lisca. He made his senior debut late in the month, starting in a 3–0 Campeonato Mineiro away win over URT.

Kawê made his Série A debut on 27 June 2021, coming on as a late substitute for Felipe Azevedo in a 1–1 home draw against Internacional.

On 27 July 2022, Kawê was hired by redbull Bragantino

Career statistics

References

External links
América Mineiro profile 

2002 births
Living people
Footballers from São Paulo
Brazilian footballers
Association football forwards
Campeonato Brasileiro Série A players
Campeonato Brasileiro Série B players
América Futebol Clube (MG) players
Red Bull Bragantino players